Tutli-ye Kuchek (also Romanized as Tūtlī-ye Kūchek) is a village in Aqabad Rural District, in the Central District of Gonbad-e Qabus County, Golestan Province, Iran. At the 2006 census, its population was 1,026, in 188 families.

References 

Populated places in Gonbad-e Kavus County